The Love of a Thief (German: Brigantenliebe) is a 1920 German silent adventure film directed by Martin Hartwig and starring Ellen Richter, Hans Adalbert Schlettow and Emil Rameau.

The film's sets were designed by the art director Jack Winter.

Cast
 Ellen Richter as Fianetta 
 Hans Adalbert Schlettow as Bandit Carlo
 Julius Falkenstein as Piselli
 Hugo Flink
 Reinhold Köstlin
 Artur Menzel
 Poldi Müller as Bianca
 Emil Rameau as Castrozzo
 Tilly Wötzel as Castrozzo's daughter

References

Bibliography
 Grange, William. Cultural Chronicle of the Weimar Republic. Scarecrow Press, 2008.

External links

1920 films
Films of the Weimar Republic
Films directed by Martin Hartwig
German silent feature films
UFA GmbH films
1920 adventure films
German adventure films
Films set in Italy
German black-and-white films
Silent adventure films
1920s German films
1920s German-language films